Gran Canaria Airport , sometimes also known as Gando Airport, is a passenger and freight airport on the island of Gran Canaria. It is an important airport within the Spanish air-transport network (owned and managed by a public enterprise, AENA), as it holds the sixth position in terms of passengers, and fifth in terms of operations and cargo transported. It also ranks first of the Canary Islands in all three categories, although the island of Tenerife has higher passenger numbers overall if statistics from the two airports located on the island are combined.

In 2014 it handled over 10.3 million passengers, ranking 1st in the Canary Islands and 5th in Spain by passenger traffic. Gran Canaria Airport is an important hub for passengers travelling to West Africa (Morocco, Mauritania, Senegal, Cape Verde, among others), and to the Atlantic Isles of Madeira and the Azores. It serves as base for Binter Canarias, Canaryfly, Ryanair, Norwegian Air Shuttle and Vueling. Other airlines use it as a base to operate charter flights to Cape Verde and Gambia (TUI fly Deutschland and TUI fly Nordic), but only in the winter.

History

In 1919, Frenchman Pierre George Latécoère was granted clearance from the French & Spanish governments to establish an airline route between Toulouse and Casablanca. This also included stopovers in Málaga, Alicante and Barcelona. The airport opened on 7 April 1930, after King Alfonso XIII signed a royal order announcing that the military air force installations on the Bay of Gando would become a civilian airfield. In its existence, the airport has become the largest gateway into the Canary Islands, as well as the largest in terms of passenger and cargo operations, although the island of Tenerife has higher passenger numbers overall between the two airports located on the island.

In 1946, the old passenger terminal opened, which took two years to build. In 1948 a runway was built, which was completed and fully tarmacked in 1957.

In 1963, improvements to the airport were made. This included new parking spaces, enlargement of the terminal and the provision of a visual approach slope indicator system. In 1964, a transmission station was built. In 1966 a new control tower was completed, replacing the old control tower that was constructed in 1946.  In 1970, work began on the current passenger terminal which opened in March 1973. During this time, a second runway was being built and this was completed in 1980. 

On 18 February 1988, Binter Canarias announced that the airline's main base was to be established at Gran Canaria. The base opened on 26 March 1989. In October 1991, the terminal was enlarged with improved facilities so it could handle more passengers.

In December 2010, low-cost carrier Ryanair announced the opening of 3 new bases on the Canary Islands.  In addition to Gran Canaria these include Lanzarote and Tenerife South. Ryanair presently operates 30 routes from Gran Canaria. The airport was an official alternative (emergency) landing site for the NASA Space Shuttle, before the ending of the Space Shuttle programme in July 2011.

As of 2011, there was a programme to expand the airport, extending the terminal and creating a new runway. In 2015 this major renovation of Gran Canaria airport was completed. Among the improvements was increasing the number of baggage belts, 16 to 24, check-in counters from 96 to 132 and gates, up to 40. The new terminal area is now fully active, doubling the previous area. There is also a plan for the building of a new runway for the airport.

Terminal

The airport has one terminal which opened in March 1973. It was extended in October 1991 to increase passenger traffic. Despite being a building of historical interest, in 2013 the original passenger terminal building, opened in 1946, was demolished to make way for a further extension which opened in 2014.  Although dramatically expanded over the years the airport remains a single terminal airport.

There are four check-in areas. Check-in Area 1 (desks 101 to 118) is in the newest part of the airport (which opened on 16 July 2014) and serves almost exclusively flights operated by CanaryFly, Air Europa and Binter Canarias (mainly inter-island flights between the Canary Islands or to Morocco).  At times of very high demand, check-in Area 1 may provide overflow capacity for Areas 2, 3 and 4.  Check-in Area 2 (desks 201 to 234) is located in the first part of the "new" airport which opened in 1973. This area was completely refurbished in 2014 and is normally used for flights handled by Iberia plus some of those handled by Ground Force (Globalia Handling). Check-in Area 3 (desks 301 to 352) is in the second part of the "new" airport which originally opened in 1991 and is used for flights handled by Ground Force. Airline Norwegian Air Shuttle have dedicated check-in desks and self-check-in podiums located at the southern end of Area 3.  Check-in Area 4 (desks 401 to 406) is located downstairs between the police station and the main car rental offices (Hertz, Europcar, CICAR, TopCar, Gold Car and Avis Rent a Car System) and is used exclusively by Ryanair.

There are two security filters where passengers pass from the general public areas into the departures area. At these security filters passengers and their hand luggage is scanned to ensure no prohibited items pass. The main security filter is located between Check-in Areas 2 and 3. There is a second filter located in Check-in Area 1 which is intended to serve exclusively passengers of inter-island flights.

The terminal departures area is split into four zones (A, B, C, and D). Zone A is for flights to the other Canary Islands, Zones B and C are for European Union (including Spain), Switzerland, Iceland, and Scandinavian flights and Zone D is for other international flights. The gates in Zone A are at ground floor level at the northern end of the terminal. Other gates are on the first floor (the same level as the security filters into departures) those in Zone D featuring additional security to allow for the screening of international passengers.

There are two arrivals areas numbered "1" and "2" both located downstairs at ground level. Area 1 serves all arrivals of flights originating within Spain and is located at the northern end of the airport.  Some of the car rental companies have additional counters in this area as it is a considerable walk to the main car rental area. Area 2 serves all international arrivals and is located at the southern end of the airport. As the majority of arrivals served by area 2 are for tourist flights, many bringing passengers travelling on package holidays organized by tour operators, there is a large coach park (Parking A) located immediately in front of this area.  Overflow coach parking (which is required only in the Winter months) is provided at the departures level (Parking B) and is accessed from arrivals area 2 via a purpose-built a pedestrian tunnel with stairs and travelators.

Airlines and destinations
The following airlines operate regular scheduled and charter flights at Gran Canaria Airport:

Statistics

Traffic figures

Route statistics

Ground transportation
The airport can be reached by several island roads from all points in the island. Bus services are provided by Global with their routes 5, 60, 66, 90 and 91.. There are also special bus services from most towns in Gran Canaria, but access by taxi is usual.

Gran Canaria's main motorway GC1 runs past the airport providing transport links to Las Palmas de Gran Canaria in the North and to the tourist resorts in the South.

Plans have existed for several years to construct a rail link connecting the airport to Las Palmas and Maspalomas. As of 2018, the Tren de Gran Canaria scheme was estimated to be underfunded by €1,500 million.

Military use
There is an airbase of the Spanish Air Force to the east of the runways. Beyond several hangars opposite to the passenger terminal, the Gando Air Base (Base Aérea de Gando) contains ten shelters situated on the southern end of the eastern runway. They harbor the Ala 46 with F/A-18 Hornets, CASA 212 and the Eurocopter AS 532 of SAR. Ala 46 or 46 Wing, composed of 462 and 802 fighter squadron, defends the Spanish airspace around the Canary Islands. It is one of the biggest and most important air bases of the Spanish Air Force and is unique for the wide variety of aircraft which it operates.

Military activity was most intense during the mid-1970s, at the time of the crisis of decolonisation of Western Sahara and its occupation by Morocco. Military crises in Western Africa, like the 2013 Mali intervention by France, made Gando Air Base the main air platform for operations in Western Africa area by NATO. In 2006 Spain proposed Gando Air Base as headquarters for the newly created US Africa Command (AFRICOM), but the AFRICOM HQ was ultimately based in Stuttgart (Germany).

The Canary Islands Air Command (Mando Aéreo de Canarias – MACAN) is based in the city of Las Palmas. Canary Islands Air Command is the only territorial general Air Command Air Force in Spain; its mission is the maintenance, preparation and command of air units located in the Canary archipelago. Any Spanish military airplane that lands in the Canary Islands is immediately put at the disposal of the Canary Islands Air Command, who can retain it and use it as long as necessary for missions within the islands. This happens sometimes with heavy military transport, antisubmarine warfare and early warning airplanes; the islands do not have these on a permanent basis. Once the plane is released by the Canary Islands Air Command, it can leave the Canary Islands and reverts to the Air Force Commands of mainland Spain.

The deployment base of Gando Air Base is the Lanzarote Military Airfield (Aeródromo Militar de Lanzarote). Lanzarote Military Airfield has permanently its own Air Force troops platoons and the radar for the air defence (the EVA 22, which covers the Eastern Canary Islands and the maritime area up to the Sahara), but it has no permanently based military planes, using the ones from Gando.

Other facilities
Canaryfly has its head office in Hangar L. Binter Canarias also has its head office on the airport grounds.

MPAIAC bombing and Tenerife disaster

At 1:15 PM on 27 March 1977, a bomb planted by the Movement for the Independence and Autonomy of the Canaries Archipelago (MPAIAC) exploded in a florist's shop on the terminal concourse. Fifteen minutes of warning was given to the airport authorities, who started to evacuate the building; the inside of the terminal was damaged and eight people were injured, one seriously. A later telephone call claimed responsibility for the explosion and hinted that a second bomb had been planted somewhere in the terminal building; the airport was closed and searched, necessitating the diversion of several incoming flights, including a number of large aircraft on long international flights, to Los Rodeos airport (later named Tenerife North Airport) on the nearby island of Tenerife. The resulting runway congestion on the small regional airport was a factor in the subsequent disaster at Los Rodeos, when just after 5:00 p.m. two Boeing 747s originally bound for Gran Canaria collided on the Los Rodeos runway, resulting in 583 deaths, the worst aviation accident in history.

References

External links

Airports in the Canary Islands
Airports established in 1930
Buildings and structures in Gran Canaria
Airport
1930 establishments in Spain
Space Shuttle Emergency Landing Sites